Blumenau railway station is one of four active railway stations in the municipality of Rapperswil-Jona in the Swiss canton of St. Gallen. Blumenau railway station is located on the Rapperswil to Ziegelbrücke line of Swiss Federal Railways.

Services

Train 
 the following S-Bahn services stop at Blumenau railway station:

Bollingen railway station, an intermediate station between Blumenau and  also located in the Rapperswil-Jona municipality, is disfunct since 2004.

Bus 
Two bus stops are within walking distance to Blumenau railway station: Geberit (north of the railway station) and Grünfeld (south of the station). Both are served by municipal bus lines 991 and 992 of Stadtbus Rapperswil-Jona, which is provided by Verkehrsbetriebe Zürichsee und Oberland (VZO). Bus services are as follows:

References

External links 
 
 

Railway stations in the canton of St. Gallen
Buildings and structures in Rapperswil-Jona
Swiss Federal Railways stations